I Made Andhika Pradana Wijaya (born 12 July 1996) is an Indonesian professional footballer who plays as a right-back for Liga 1 club Bali United.

Biography
I Made Andhika Wijaya was born in Jakarta on 12 July 1996, he is the eldest of three children from a mother named Indah Wijaya. His father, I Made Pasek Wijaya was a former national football player, he is also the nephew of Made Sony Kawiarda, a former Persegi Gianyar coach. 

I Made Andhika's professional career began after he became a member of the PS Badung senior team in 2013 after previously a member in Perseden Denpasar. At a young age, he took part in bringing PS Badung promotion to the First Division in 2014. He also once helped bring the Denpasar Porprov team to win a gold medal at the 2015 Bali Porprov event which was held in Singaraja. A single goal from I Made Andhika at that time successfully led Denpasar to win in the Buleleng Porprov, thwarting the struggle of the Badung Regency Porprov.

At the end of 2016, I Made Andhika was promoted to the Bali United first team.

I Made Andhika Wijaya body height is 173cm (5'7 ft) and weight 64kg.

Bali United Career
He made his debut in Liga 1 on 16 April 2017 against Madura United. On 25 October 2018, Andhika scored his first goal for Bali United against Borneo in the 74th minute at the Kapten I Wayan Dipta Stadium, Gianyar Regency, Bali. On 2 December 2019, Bali United won the championship for the first time in their history, becoming the seventh club to win the Liga 1 after second placed Borneo draw to PSM, followed by a win in Semen Padang, giving Bali United a 17-point lead with only four games left.

Career statistics

Club

Honours

Club
Bali United
 Liga 1: 2019, 2021–22

References

External links
 Andhika Wijaya at Soccerway
 Andhika Wijaya at Bali United Official Website

Living people
1996 births
People from Jakarta
Indonesian Hindus
Indonesian footballers
Balinese people
Association football defenders
Liga 1 (Indonesia) players
Bali United F.C. players
Sportspeople from Jakarta